The Roman Catholic Diocese of Paramaribo (Latin: Dioecesis Paramariboënsis; Dutch: Bisdom Paramaribo) (erected 22 November 1817, as the Prefecture Apostolic of Dutch Guyana-Suriname) is a suffragan of the Archdiocese of Port of Spain. It was elevated to an apostolic vicariate on 12 September 1842 and to the Diocese of Paramaribo on 7 May 1958.

Bishops

Ordinaries
Paulus Antonius Wennekers (1817-1823)
Martinus van der Weijden (1825–1826)
Jacobus Grooff (1826–1852), also appointed Vicar Apostolic of Batavia, Dutch East Indies
Jacobus Gerardus Schepers (1842–1863)
Johannes Baptista Swinkels, C.SS.R. (1865–1875)
Johannes Henricus Schaap, C.SS.R. (1876–1889)
Wilhelmus Antonius Ferdinand Wulfingh, C.SS.R. (1889–1906)
Jacobus Cornelis Meeuwissen, C.SS.R. (1907–1911)
Theodorus Antonius Leonardus Maria van Roosmalen, C.SS.R. (1911–1947)
Stephanus Joseph Maria Magdalena Kuijpers, C.SS.R. (1946–1971)
Aloysius Ferdinandus Zichem, C.SS.R. (1971–2003) – Bishop Emeritus
Wilhelmus Adrianus Josephus Maria de Bekker (2005–2014) – Bishop Emeritus
Karel Choennie (2016 – )

Auxiliary bishop
Aloysius Ferdinandus Zichem, C.SS.R. (1969-1971), appointed Bishop here

External links and references
Diocese of Paramaribo – Suriname official site

 http://catholic-hierarchy.org/diocese/dpara.html

Catholic Church in Suriname
Paramaribo
Paramaribo
Paramaribo
1810s establishments in Suriname
Roman Catholic Ecclesiastical Province of Port of Spain